A fire escape is a special kind of emergency exit, usually mounted to the outside of a building or occasionally inside but separate from the main areas of the building. It provides a method of escape in the event of a fire or other emergency that makes the stairwells inside a building inaccessible. Fire escapes are most often found on multiple-story residential buildings, such as apartment buildings. 

At one time, they were a very important aspect of fire safety for all new construction in urban areas; more recently, however, they have fallen out of common use. This is due to the improved building codes incorporating fire detectors, technologically advanced fire fighting equipment, which includes better communications and the reach of fire fighting ladder trucks, and more importantly fire sprinklers. The international building codes and other authoritative agencies have incorporated fire sprinklers into multi-story buildings below 15 stories and not just skyscrapers.

Description

A fire escape consists of a number of horizontal platforms, one at each story of a building, with ladders or stairs connecting them. The platform and stairs are usually open steel gratings, to prevent the build-up of ice, snow, and leaves. Railings are usually provided on each of the levels, but as fire escapes are designed for emergency use only, these railings often do not need to meet the same standards as railings in other contexts. The ladder from the lowest level of the fire escape to the ground may be fixed, but more commonly it swings down on a hinge or slides down along a track. The moveable designs allow occupants to safely reach the ground in the event of a fire but prevent people from accessing the fire escape from the ground at other times (such as to perpetrate a burglary or vandalism).

Exit from the interior of a building to the fire escape may be provided by a fire exit door, but in most cases the only exit is through a window. When there is a door, it is often fitted with a fire alarm to prevent other uses of the fire escape, and to prevent unauthorized entry. As many fire escapes were built before the advent of electronic fire alarms, fire escapes in older buildings have often needed to be retrofitted with alarms for this purpose.

An alternative form of rapid-exit fire escape developed in the early 1900s was a long canvas tube suspended below a large funnel outside the window of a tall building. A person escaping the fire would slide down the interior of the tube, and could control the speed of descent by pushing outward on the tube walls with their arms and legs. This escape tube could be rapidly deployed from a window and hung down to street level, though it was large and bulky to store inside the building.

A modern type of evacuation slide is the vertical spiral escape chute, which is a common means of evacuation for buildings and other structures.

History

One of the first fire escapes of any type was invented in 18th-century England. In 1784, Daniel Maseres, of England, invented a machine called a fire escape, which, being fastened to the window, would enable a person to descend to the street without injury. Abraham Wivell created a variation on the design, including an escape chute, after becoming superintendent of the "Royal Society for the Protection of Life from Fire." The first modern fire escape was patented by Anna Conelly in 1887. Henry Vieregg patented a US fire escape in Grand Island, NE in November 8, 1898 , serial number 681,672, which was designed for traveling businessmen.

As building codes became more common in countries around the turn of the 20th century, fire safety became an important concern for new construction. Building owners were increasingly required to provide adequate escape routes, and at the time, fire escapes seemed the best option available.  Not only could they be included in new construction at a low cost, but they could be very easily added to existing construction. As building codes evolved and more safety concerns addressed over subsequent editions, all construction above a certain number of stories was required to have a second means of egress, and external fire escapes were allowed as a retrofit option for existing buildings prior to the post-World War II period.

In the 1930s, the enclosed tubular chute type fire escape became widely accepted for schools, hospitals and other institution replaced the open iron ladder type.  Its main advantage was people would have no reason to use it for anything other than a fire escape and patients could be slid down it in a fire on their bedding.

However, with the rise of urban sprawl in the mid-20th century, particularly the increase in public housing in cities in the United States and Europe in the 1950s and 1960s, certain problems with fire escapes became clear. In the poorer areas of several major American cities, such as New York, Boston, Chicago, Cleveland, Detroit, Philadelphia, and Pittsburgh, fire escapes were commonly used for everything but their intended purpose.

In the hot summer months, residents of mid-rise apartment buildings would sleep outside on the platforms of their fire escapes. Such a situation triggered the plot premise of Cornell Woolrich's 1947 short story, "The Boy Cried Murder", about a boy on a fire escape who one night witnesses a murder in a neighboring apartment; this story was filmed as the suspense thriller The Window (1949). The practice of sleeping on fire escapes can also be seen in Alfred Hitchcock's 1954 movie Rear Window (also based on a Woolrich short story), as well as Weegee's photography of the Lower East Side. Diagonal shadows of fire escapes made them a constant motif in film noir, and the balcony scene of Romeo and Juliet was transposed to a fire escape for the musical West Side Story. Fire escapes could also be used to comic effect, as seen in Stanley Kramer's 1963 comedy It's a Mad, Mad, Mad, Mad World.

The installation of window air conditioners in individual apartment units with fire escape-facing windows, often installed against code or local ordinance by residents, which require the unit to be affixed to the window sash, also make a fire escape nearly useless in the summer months; the bulk and weight of an air conditioner unit shoved onto or over a fire escape in an emergency also creates additional danger for firefighters and evacuees.

Boston Herald American photographer Stanley Forman won a 1976 Pulitzer Prize for the photograph Fire Escape Collapse capturing a young woman and child plunging from a faulty fire escape during a 1975 Boston fire. The controversial image resulted in some jurisdictions enacting tougher fire safety codes.

High-rise fire escapes
As buildings are built taller and taller, new fire escape ideas have been gaining popularity. Elevators, though traditionally not used as fire escapes, are now being thought of as a possible evacuation for high-rises and skyscrapers. Other alternative high-rise fire escape solutions include parachutes, external collapsible elevators, and slides.

Residential
The use of a fire escape is dictated by various local, state, and agreed upon international building codes, such as standards provided by the International Code Council (ICC), the International Building Code (IBC), or the International Energy Conservation Code.  Both the 2012 IBC and 2012 IRC require emergency escape and rescue openings for residential buildings of 4 floors or less, in sleeping rooms and basements with habitable space, for means of emergency egress.  A fire escape can be a window, and if above the first floor with an approved ladder, or door that leads to a porch with ground access or a fire escape ladder. Federal rules, such as those of the U.S. Department of Housing and Urban Development (HUD), have requirements that follow ICC codes.

See also
ANSI/ISEA 110-2003

References

External links 

 An Escape, and a Retreat: Porches in the Sky Bind a Neighborhood by David W. Chen, The New York Times, August 15, 2004.
 ICC codes
 NFPA - Home Fire Escape Plan

Stairways
Safety equipment
Fire protection